The LVG D.II (company designation D 12) was a German fighter plane built by LVG in World War I. It originally flew in 1916, but was damaged during flight tests and never saw production.

Design
The D.II was a single-seat biplane fighter with wings of unequal span and a plywood covered semi-monocoque fuselage as seen on the earlier D.10 prototype fighter. V struts connected the wings, and the fuselage occupied the gap between the wings. The pilot's cockpit was situated just behind the wing's trailing edge, with a small headrest behind it. The D.II also had a cross axle undercarriage.

Specifications

References

Bibliography

1910s German fighter aircraft
D 02
Rotary-engined aircraft
Biplanes
Aircraft first flown in 1916